Charlie Myers is a retired American football (soccer) forward who played professionally in the American Soccer League.

Myers graduated from Overlea High School where he was a member of the school's State Championship soccer team.  He attended the University of Baltimore where he played on the men's soccer team from 1971 to 1975.  His senior season, Baltimore won the NCAA Men's Division II Soccer Championship and Myers was selected as the Tournament MVP.  Myers was also a 1975 Honorable Mention (third team) All American.  He was inducted into the school's Athletic Hall of Fame in 2006.  Drafted by the Dallas Tornado of the North American Soccer League, Myers was loaned to the Tacoma Tides for the 1976 American Soccer League season.

He was inducted into the Maryland Soccer Hall of Fame in 1996.

References

External links
 Baltimore SC
 NASL stats
  Tacoma Tides player profile

Living people
American soccer players
American Soccer League (1933–1983) players
Dallas Tornado players
North American Soccer League (1968–1984) players
Tacoma Tides players
Association football forwards
Year of birth missing (living people)
Soccer players from Maryland
Sportspeople from Baltimore County, Maryland
Baltimore Bees men's soccer players
University of Baltimore alumni